Football Federation of Zakarpattia is a football governing body in the region of Zakarpattia Oblast, Ukraine. The federation is a member of the Football Federation of Ukraine.

Previous Champions

1945    FC Spartak Uzhhorod (1)
1946    FC Dynamo Mukacheve (1)
1947    FC Dynamo Mukacheve (2)
1948    FC Dynamo Mukacheve (3)
1949    FC Dynamo Mukacheve (4)
1950    FC Dynamo Mukacheve (5)
1951    FC Dynamo Mukacheve (6)
1952    FC Chervona Zirka Chynadiyovo (1)
1953 sp FC Spartak Uzhhorod (2)
1953 fa FC Misktorh Mukacheve (1)
1954    FC Iskra Vynohradiv (1)
1955 sp FC Chervona Zirka Bushtyno (1)
1955 fa FC Burevisnyk Vynohradiv (1)
1956    FC Chervona Zirka Uzhhorod (1)
1957    FC Burevisnyk Solotvyno (1)
1958    FC Avanhard Dovhe (1)
1959    FC Avanhard Khust (1)
1960    FC Avanhard Khust (2)
1961    FC Kolhospnyk Berehove (1)
1962    FC Pryladyst Mukacheve (1)
1963    FC Chervona Zirka Uzhhorod (2)
1964    FC Avanhard Khust (3)
1965    FC Avanhard Khust (4)
1966    FC Kolhospnyk Storozhnytsia (1)
1967    FC Khimik Perechyn (1)
1968    FC Meblevyk Khust (1)
1969    FC Kooperator Berehove (2)
1970    FC Latorytsia Mukacheve (1)
1971    FC Latorytsia Mukacheve (2)
1972    FC Shakhtar Ilnytsia (1)
1973    FC Derevoobrobnyk Vylok (1)
1974    FC Plastmasovyk Vynohradiv (1)
1975    FC Radvanka Uzhhorod (1)
1976    FC Plastmasovyk Vynohradiv (2)
1977    FC Urozhai Kolchyno (1)
1978    FC Karpaty Bushtyno (1)
1979    FC Urozhai Kolchyno (2)
1980    FC Kolos Nove Davydkovo (1)
1981    FC Kolos Nove Davydkovo (2)
1982    FC Kooperator Khust (1)
1983    FC Avanhard Svalyava (1)
1984    FC Keramik Vynohradiv (1)
1985    FC Kolos Zastavne (1)
1986    FC Kolos Vyshkovo (1)
1987    FC Kooperator Khust (2)
1988    FC Keramik Vynohradiv (2)
1989    FC Keramik Vynohradiv (3)
1990    FC Keramik Vynohradiv (4)
1991    FC Tysa Petrovo (1)
1992    FC Aval Dovhe (1)
1993 sp FC Skala Kolchyno (1)
1993-94 FC Aval Dovhe (2)
1994-95 FC Buzhora Irshava (1)
1995-96 FC Karpaty Rakhiv (1)
1996-97 FC Vizhybu Berehove (3)
1997-98 SC Linet Berehove (4)
1998 fa SC Linet Berehove (5)
1999    SKA-Palanok Mukacheve (1)
2000    SC Perechyn (1)
2001    FC Avanhard Svalyava (2)
2002    FC Avanhard Svalyava (3)
2003    FC Avanhard Svalyava (4)
2004    FC Avanhard Svalyava (5)
2005    FC Avanhard Svalyava (6)
2006    FC Avanhard Svalyava (7)
2007    FC Mukacheve (2)
2008    FC Mukacheve (3)
2009    SC Beregvidek Berehove (6)
2010    SC Beregvidek Berehove (7)
2011    SC Beregvidek Berehove (8)
2012    FC Mukacheve (4)
2013    FC Meteor Pistryalovo (1)
2014    FC Polyana (1)
2015    FC Uzhhorod (1)
2016    FC Uzhhorod (2)
2017    FC Mynai (1)
2018    FC Sevlyush Vynohradiv (1)
2019    FC Sevlyush Vynohradiv (2)

Top winners
 8 – SC Beregvidek Berehove
 7 – FC Avanhard Svalyava
 6 – FC Dynamo Mukacheve 
 4 – 3 clubs (Mukacheve, Keramik, Avanhard Khust)
 2 – 10 clubs
 1 – 24 clubs

Professional clubs
Before the World War II, on territory of the region existed at least on professional football club SC Rusj Uzhorod which until 1938 played in Czechoslovakia and during the war in 1939–1944 in Hungary.
 FC Hoverla Uzhhorod (Spartak, Verkhovyna, Zakarpattia) 1946–1949, 1951-2016

 FC Karpaty Mukacheve (Bolshevik, Pryladyst) 1948–1949, 1968–1970, 1991–1997
 FC Fetrovyk Khust 1992–1995
 FC Berkut Bedevlia 1997–1998 (single season)
 FC Mynai 2018–
 FC Uzhhorod 2019–

See also
 FFU Council of Regions

References

External links
 Zakarpattia Oblast. Ukrayinskyi Football 

Football in the regions of Ukraine
Football governing bodies in Ukraine
Sport in Zakarpattia Oblast